"Infinity" is a 2013 comic book crossover storyline that was published by Marvel Comics. Written by Jonathan Hickman with artwork by a rotating team of artists including Jim Cheung, Jerome Opeña, and Dustin Weaver, the series debuted in August 2013 and ran through November 2013.

The storyline concerns issues built up in multiple Marvel comic books as part of the Marvel NOW! initiative, primarily Avengers and New Avengers. These issues include a threat to the universe by an ancient race of aliens known as the Builders. The second is the mysterious ailments plaguing the universe with Earth at the center. The third is the political ramifications these events have on Earth's relationship to the rest of the galactic community.

The story itself involves Thanos attacking Earth while the Avengers are in space uniting the universe against the Builders, with the events of the 2013 "Age of Ultron" storyline acting as a catalyst for the rest of the universe to formally target Earth. The various tie-ins tell Thanos's attack from the perspective of various Marvel characters.

The aftermath of the event leads directly into the "Inhumanity" storyline, in which the Terrigen Mist is released throughout Earth, activating the latent abilities of dormant Inhumans.

A new Infinity-based event titled Infinity Countdown began February 2018 as part of the Marvel Legacy initiative.

Publication history
Infinity was announced in February 2013 as part of Marvel's Free Comic Book Day preview story. Axel Alonso, Marvel's Editor-in-Chief, said "We've said how 'Nova,' 'Thanos Rising,' 'Guardians of the Galaxy' and Jonathan Hickman's 'Avengers' are all shaping the future of the Marvel Universe — this image will very specifically answer the question of 'How?...Our FCBD issue features an all-new story that leads into a huge epic later in the year". In April 2013, Marvel officially released details concerning the event, revealing it would run 6 issues and tie-in with Hickman's other two Avengers titles. In April 2013, Tom Brevoort stated the amount of tie-ins will be similar to that of the Fear Itself storyline.

In May 2013 it was announced two of the tie-in would be Kelly Sue DeConnick's books Avengers Assemble and Captain Marvel with issues 18-20 and 15-16 respectively. The Avengers Assemble tie-in will tell the event from the perspective of Spider-Woman in issues 18 and 19 while Captain Marvel will follow Carol Danvers as she and Hawkeye are captured in space. Issue 20 of Avengers Assemble will feature the Uncanny Avengers. In June 2013 it was announced that a new Mighty Avengers team would form during the events of Infinity. The team would have a diverse roster consisting of Luke Cage, the Superior Spider-Man, Falcon, Power Man, White Tiger, Blue Marvel, Monica Rambeau, She-Hulk, and a new Ronin.

In June 2013 it was announced that two 4 issue mini-series would spin-out of Infinity, one titled the Infinity: The Heist and the other Infinity: The Hunt. The Heist involves a group of Iron Man villains led by Spymaster taking advantage of the chaos caused by Thanos's invasion of Earth to steal equipment from Stark Industries. It would be written by Frank Tieri with art by Al Barrionuevo. The Hunt features Wolverine, She-Hulk, and Hank Pym gathering the young heroes of the Marvel universe to hold a new Contest of Champions. However, Thanos interrupts this with his own challenge. It would be written by Matt Kindt with art by Steven Sanders. Other tie-ins were announced throughout June including Fearless Defenders, Secret Avengers, Superior Spider-Man Team-Up, and Thunderbolts.

In July 2013, it was announced that the repercussions of Infinity would result in a new comic book storyline titled Inhumanity, with a new ongoing Inhumans series by Matt Fraction at the heart of it. During Infinity the Terrigen Mist will be spread throughout the world and result in Inhuman cells activating in large portions of the population. The Inhuman Royal Family will be split into different houses all competing to recruit these new Inhumans.

Plot summary

Prologue – The Tribute
On a distant planet, an alien being known as Outrider returns (Outriders are genetically produced assassins that serve their masters) and brings a message about a planet known as Ahl-Agullo to another alien being, Corvus Glaive. Corvus Glaive relays this message for his master and asks if this pleases him. Corvus Glaive's master replies "yes" as the Outrider is sent on another mission. Corvus Glaive appears on Ahl-Agullo and demands a tribute from the king of the Ahl-Agullo and references that its planet's greatest warrior and son is dead. Corvus Glaive then reveals that the last time his master came to this world, he burned this world down and asks the king to pay a tribute. Returning to his master, Corvus Glaive gives his master Ahl-Agullo's tribute and asks if this tribute pleases him. Corvus' master Thanos replies "yes". The tribute is revealed to be a crate containing the severed heads of many Ahl-Agullo citizens.

Prelude
A week before the current events, Nightmask finds Starbrand drawing pictures with his powers while imprisoned on Sol's Hammer. Starbrand remarks that so much has changed for him and that he would see the hydrogen in the Sun fusing together and he asks what is happening to him. Nightmask states that as his powers evolve, so does his mind. Nightmask then resumes coaching Starbrand. A little while later, Starbrand learns that the prison is not powerful enough to hold both him and Nightmask and asks why don't they leave, but Nightmask says they must wait until he has full control of his powers.

Meanwhile, Manifold and Captain Universe have arrived on the alien planet Galador. Captain Universe tells her teammate to return to Earth and tell the Avengers that they have not done enough, that the Machine is not complete as Captain Universe quotes "To protect a world your must possess the power to destroy a world." Manifold leaves as the Galadorian Spaceknights leap into action.

Back on Earth, Bruce Banner warns the Avengers of the approach of the mysterious Organism that has escaped from A.I.M. Island and is headed to their location. Worse yet, Banner then transforms into the Hulk and seriously damages the Helicarrier. The Avengers are then slammed by the Organism, and fight back but are beaten.

On A.I.M. Island, Andrew Forson (the current Scientist Supreme) and Superia are licking their wounds from the Organism's escape. An A.I.M. Agent then approaches them showing them a 2-D hologram of the Organism beating the Avengers. Taking pride in this, Andrew Forson orders their translocator activated and to retrieve their "lost child".

Upon receiving word from Captain Universe of a threat that is coming to Earth, the Avengers are advised to get Ex Nihilo and Abyss on their side and to free Starbrand and Nightmask so that they can help combat this threat. The threat in question turns out to be the Builders who are destroying many "imperfect" planets that don't fit their vision, and have cataloged Earth as a failure ever since they learned of Ex Nihilo's creation. The Avengers follow Captain Universe's suggestion and get Ex Nihilo, Abyss, Starbrand, and Nightmask onto the team.

Corvus Glaive and the rest of the Black Order (which also consisted of Black Dwarf, Ebony Maw, Proxima Midnight, and Supergiant) arrive on Earth and appeared at the different parts of the Earth to confront the Illuminati. Corvus Glaive and Supergiant arrived at the Jean Grey School for Higher Learning, Black Dwarf arrived in Wakanda, Ebony Maw arrived at the Sanctum Sanctorum, and Proxima arrived at Atlantis.

Core miniseries and Avengers/New Avengers

Part 1 – "Infinity"
Arriving on Earth, the Outrider begins looking for Earth's secrets as he searches through Avengers Tower and the Jean Grey School for Higher Learning. Appearing at a S.W.O.R.D. base, the Outrider is seen killing a S.W.O.R.D. agent in an effort to find Earth's weakness. While badly beaten by the Inhumans, the Outrider is ultimately able to inform Thanos that the Avengers have left Earth, prompting his forces to prepare to invade Earth.

Avengers – "Avengers Universe 1"
The Avengers travel in space to the Galactic Council to decide the fate of the incoming Builders. The decision is to lure them into a trap and destroy them. Things go well in the Council's favor until the Builders decloak the rest of their fleet and destroy most of the Council's frigates. The Avengers, together with the remaining ships retreat in defeat.

New Avengers – "The Cull Obsidian"
Thanos' Black Order arrives on Earth and demands a tribute in exchange for the survival of its inhabitants. Black Bolt reveals to the Illuminati that Thanos used the demand for the tribute (the heads of young Inhumans between the ages of sixteen and twenty-two) as a cover for the search of his lost Inhuman-descendant son.

Part 2 – "Fall"
Most of the alien empires try to stop the Builders, which causes some catastrophic results. The Black Order arrives on Attilan where they demand a tribute of young Inhuman heads that range from the ages of 16 and 22. Using the Terrigen Codex, Black Bolt discovers that Thanos was using the demand for a tribute as a cover-up to kill his lost Inhuman-descendant son whose actual identity and location are unknown to him.

Avengers – "Building Towards Collapse"

New Avengers – "The Thanos Seed"
Black Dwarf retreats after finding a heavy resistance in Wakanda, causing his expulsion from the Black Order. Using the Terrigen Codex, the Illuminati embark on the search for Thanos' son Thane, but are stopped by the appearance of a new incursion in Australia. Before reaching a decision about what to do about the other Earth, the Illuminati are greeted by an Aleph arriving from the other Earth. The Aleph leads them to the Builders of that universe who explained that the early death of the Multiverse had led to the collapse of the superflow (the space between universes that they used to traverse them). In order to avert disaster and ensure the Multiverse survives, the Builders across the multiverse have decided to destroy all Earths, thus hopefully stopping the incursions. Since the Builders of Earth-616 had failed in their mission, these Builders urged the Illuminati to destroy their own world.

Part 3 – "Kingdoms Fall"
Most of the alien empires have decided to surrender to the Builders. Captain America managed to make himself heard by the Galactic Council and planned a retaliation against the Builders which resulted in the successful liberation of the Avengers who were being held captive and the destruction of numerous forces of the Builders, partially turning the tide of the battle. After the Inhumans deny a tribute to Corvus Glaive, Thanos appears on Attilan to meet with Black Bolt. Black Bolt attacks Thanos with his hypersonic voice.

Avengers – "The Offer"
Black Dwarf is given another chance to prove himself by Thanos. Black Dwarf is sent to keep the Peak from being reclaimed by the Avengers.

Part 4 – "Thane"
Captain America still realized they were outnumbered and outgunned, and decided to perform a false surrender. Thor falsely surrendered to the Builder who was under control of Hala and killed him, freeing the planet and gaining powerful lost allies. Thanos eventually survives Black Bolt's attack and continues the fight. As Thanos fights against Black Bolt, he detonates a Terrigen Bomb which decimates Attilan and subjects everyone on Earth bearing latent Inhuman genes to go through the process of Terrigenesis, resulting in the emergence of thousands of Inhumans. Thane's power is unleashed, where it kills the inhabitants of his town in the process. Thanos fights Black Bolt where he demands to be told the location of his son. Black Bolt refuses to reveal the location which results in Thanos getting angry and knocking out Black Bolt.

Part 5 - "The Left Hand of Death"
The death of the Builder at Thor's hands and the subsequent liberation of Hala sparks a general insurrection at all Builder-occupied worlds, which are dubbed "Avengers Worlds" by their grateful citizens in honor of Earth's heroes. Meanwhile, Thane has been captured by Ebony Maw, who reports his success back to Thanos. The Avengers receive word that Earth has fallen to Thanos. The Avengers and their allies head to Earth to free it from Thanos.

Avengers - "...To the Very End"
Black Dwarf fights the Avengers to keep them from reclaiming the Peak. During the battle, Ronan the Accuser arrives to help the Avengers where Ronan declares Black Dwarf guilty and kills him.

Part 6 - "Amber"
The Avengers, the Guardians of the Galaxy, and Agent Brand and her personnel retake the Peak while Starbrand devastates the majority of the enemy fleet with his power, forcing the survivors into a retreat. In Necropolis the Illuminati confront Supergiant and an enslaved Gladiator, and she is defeated after Lockjaw teleports her to an uninhabited world along with an anti-matter bomb that Maximus detonates. Captain America, Captain Marvel, the Hulk, Hyperion, and Thor confront Thanos and his Black Order in Orollan. Corvus Glaive is killed by Hyperion, but Thanos and Proxima Midnight put the Avengers on the brink of the defeat. Ebony Maw turns on his master and manipulates Thane into putting Thanos and Proxima Midnight into a state of "living death", freezing them in amber. In the aftermath, the heroes and their allies pick up the pieces and rebuild in their own way, while the Illuminati continue to secretly find ways to prevent the impending death of the multiverse, with Thanos and Proxima Midnight in their custody.

Tie-ins

Avengers Assemble
When the Terrigen Bomb was detonated in Earth's atmosphere, a housewife named Alice Taylor-Kezierski was exposed to the Terrigen Mists and entered a state of Terrigenesis. After emerging from her cocoon, she accidentally enlarged her husband causing Alice, two of her neighbors, and her house to shrink to the Microverse. With the help of Wasp and Wonder Man of the Uncanny Avengers, Alice was able to enlarge her house and her neighbors and shrink her husband back to their original proportions.

Captain Marvel
In Captain Marvel 15, after Carol Danvers had lost her memory, she participated in the Battle of the Corridor, temporarily regaining her binary powers as she drew near a black hole.

Fearless Defenders
Ren Kimura is a Japanese-American dancer who underwent Terrigenesis and discovered that she can conjure razor sharp metal ribbons from her fingertips. She joined the Fearless Defenders after being rescued from Thanos' forces.

Guardians of the Galaxy
After parting ways with Angela, the Guardians were off in space when they received a message from Abigail Brand asking them to help free her from the Black Dwarf's forces and liberate the Peak, S.W.O.R.D.'s orbital headquarters. Star-Lord and Rocket Raccoon enter the Peak and free Brand, but are cornered by Badoon forces, only to be rescued by Angela. With the help of the other Guardians, they regain control of the Peak's offensive weapons, thus easing the Avengers' assault on Earth when they return.

Infinity: Against the Tide
On the Skrull-owned planet of Hy'lt Minor, the Builders are brutally destroying any civilization the Skrulls created over time. Two best friends, a boy named K'eel R'kt and a girl named Rhena desperately attempt to survive. As they struggle, they are intercepted by a Skrull commander who is trying to make himself the only survivor. He quickly hits Rhena and presumably kills her. As the chaos grows, Silver Surfer arrives telling K'eel and the rest of the Skrulls that he is here to save the planet. However, the Skrull commander (believing that Norrin Radd is the herald to Galactus) starts a riot to further his troubles. Luckily, Rhena regains consciousness and Norrin pushes back some of the forces. However, they soon return.<ref>Infinity: Against the Tide: Infinity Comic #1</ref>

Infinity: Heist
Since the death of Mandarin, Blizzard II was seen robbing banks with Whirlwind. While the Avengers were away from Earth fighting the Builders, Spymaster approached Blizzard II and Whirlwind who offered them to join up with him, Constrictor, Firebrand IV, Titanium Man, Unicorn I, and Whiplash IV in a plot to attack the almost-defenseless Stark Tower. During the briefing, Blizzard suddenly collapses. When Blizzard regains consciousness, he discovers that his skin has turned white and he can generate ice on his own. Blizzard had been exposed to the Terrigen Mists unleashed upon the face of the entire Earth by Black Bolt. Being secretly an Inhuman descendant, Blizzard suffered Terrigenesis which causes the manifestation of his latent powers. Blizzard thought that this was his opportunity to "be part of something bigger" and decided to leave Spymaster's team. However, he and Whirlwind where brutally attacked by Spymaster and Titanium Man when they tried to leave.

Blizzard and Whirlwind were forced into taking part of the assault to Stark Tower. After Spymaster used teleporter discs to teleport some Iron Man Armors to the buyers, he escaped and left Blizzard and the rest of his accomplices to be discovered by the heroes which were using the tower as a base. They managed to defeat the heroes, and they were offered to be taken to Spymaster by Titanium Man. When they arrived to a spaceship where Spymaster was, they were ambushed by him and Titanium Man who revealed himself as Captain Atlas of the Kree (who were the masterminds behind the heist). They managed to escape custody and started fighting Spymaster, Titanium Man and the army of Iron Men (which were controlled by the first). The actual Iron Man arrived to the spaceship after having tracked down the armors and helped Blizzard and his allies defeat the enemies. During the fight, Blizzard used the powers he discovered of being like a human battery to overcharge the armors and deactivate them, but he fainted and fell off the spaceship's cargo door. A suit Iron Man was controlling rescued him. But in order to let his friends escape, Blizzard froze himself and the suit. Blizzard was taken to S.H.I.E.L.D. custody and was left under the simulation he had been delivered to the Inhumans in order to prove himself as the changed man Gill thought he was....until S.H.I.E.L.D. could know what to do with him.

Infinity: The Hunt
Shortly before Thanos' invasion of Earth, Hank Pym and some other people create a "Contest of Champions" (the name was chosen from a long list of names) which is to serve as a battle tournament between adolescent superheroes. The tournament will be held at the Avengers Compound at Palo Alto, California. The tournament will be supervised by Hank Pym (representing the Avengers Academy), Meggan (representing the Braddock Academy), Wolverine (representing the Jean Grey School for Higher Learning), and She-Hulk (representing the Future Foundation). As the various contestants are being selected from the Avengers Academy, the Braddock Academy, the Future Foundation, the Jean Grey School for Higher Learning, the Pan-Asian School for the Unusually Gifted, Wakandan School of Alternative Studies, and the Latverian School of Science, a news broadcast is shown that features the destruction of Atlantis due to Wakanda's Invasion.

Mighty Avengers
As the Avengers have left Earth to fight the Builders, Thanos has come to tear the Illuminati apart. Ebony Maw has been tasked to defeat Doctor Strange while Proxima Midnight desires to destroy the city. The Heroes for Hire were able to thwart a robbery of robot parts committed by Plunderer's men. Plunderer tries to get away, but is stopped by the Superior Spider-Man (Doctor Octopus' mind in Peter Parker's body). After the Superior Spider-Man considered the Heroes for Hire as mercenaries, White Tiger quits the team. On the other side of town, Monica Rambeau, now answering to "Spectrum", chases down Blue Streak before a stranger tries to recruit her for a mysterious end. At a diner, Luke Cage and Power Man are discussing recent events. Power Man wants to attack Spider-Man, but Luke is a different man now for he wants to care and support his family. Power Man then plans to start his version of the Avengers. Proxima Midnight and her troops jump out of Thanos' ship and land in New York. She stands up in a crater and commands her host to hunt and kill. Spectrum hears the explosions and goes to help out. Her mysterious guest says he cannot be seen in America, and needs her help for a mysterious mission, but she is adamant... he is in a costume shop, and if he wants her help, he'll put on a costume and come help her.

At the impact point, Proxima Midnight is leading her people when Luke Cage, Superior Spider-Man, and Spectrum all show up at the same time. They are suddenly joined by Spectrum's mystery man who is wearing a "Spider Hero" costume. The Mighty Avengers continue to battle the forces of Proxima Midnight. Spectrum is seriously injured. Bystanders help the Avengers get back in the fight. Thanos appears in hologram form berating Proxima Midnight for her failure to destroy the city. Uatu the Watcher visits Blue Marvel in his Undersea Science Fortress which he had previously modified. Blue Marvel talks with Uatu about his family life and how he could've taken up the opportunity to join the Avengers while mentioning his humanitarian work. Ebony Maw uses Doctor Strange to summon Shuma-Gorath to Earth. After a one-sided conversation, Blue Marvel took up his costume and flew through Shuma-Gorath's head during its fight with the heroes that are with Luke Cage. He was able to heal Spectrum (who had been incapacitated by Proxima Midnight's spear). Blue Marvel was able to boost her powers temporarily to fight off their opponents. After the battle, Blue Marvel was among those Luke Cage declared in his Mighty Avengers.

Nova
After the skatepark was rebuilt following that he had accidentally destroyed during his superhero career, Sam encounters his crush, Carrie. Sam was caught off-guard when she told him that she knew that he was Nova. He then flew away in such a rush that he made a stupid mistake of accidentally removing his helmet mid-flight and fell straight out of the sky. When he awoke from the minor coma he had suffered, he finds New Warriors members Justice and Speedball trying to persuade him into joining the New Warriors. He initially refuses until he learned that they were good friends of Richard Rider. Nova agreed to see what it was like and what they know about the Nova Corps and Force.

Secret Avengers
S.H.I.E.L.D. Computer Specialist Sarah Garza was one of the newly surfaced Inhumans after Black Bolt unleashed the Terrigen Mist upon the face of the Earth. Shortly after emerging from a cocoon, her unstable powers created an explosion which decimated her entire apartment complex. She was retained by S.H.I.E.L.D. and Maria Hill after finding out she was one of theirs and realized Garza could be a potential asset against Thanos' forces. Although she lacked experience, Maria Hill partnered her with Iron Patriot and gave her an armor to control her powers. She and Iron Patriot arrived to Brooklyn as reinforcements to help Nick Fury, Jr. and Phil Coulson fight the invading forces. Sarah created a powerful blast which along with the support of the Iron Patriot Drones, annihilated the aliens. During the sweep, the heroes were attacked by an unknown enemy with apparent telekinetic powers that blamed Sarah Garza for what happened to the apartment complex. When the strain of using his powers made the unknown enemy pass out, the Avengers proceeded to find refuge. As the communication signal was no longer being jammed, S.H.I.E.L.D. managed to get visual on the villain. It was revealed the Junkman of Brooklyn was a man called Gavrel Achter, who was one of the newly surfaced Inhumans after Black Bolt unleashed the Terrigen Mists upon the entire face of the Earth. When Nick Fury Jr. tried to talk to the Junkman of Brooklyn, he threw a car at the team, seemingly crushing Sarah Garza. Sarah raised from the debris and retaliated the Junkman of Brooklyn. When he was about to be killed, Garza stopped upon realizing she could not become a murderer. Before he could react, Nick Fury Jr. sniped at the Junkman of Brooklyn and killed him. Saddened, Sarah mourned the Junkman of Brooklyn's death. Back at the S.H.I.E.L.D. Helicarrier, Sarah Garza expressed to Maria Hill the desire to go back to Tech Ops. Sarah Garza was confined in a cell until her powers could be stabilized.

Superior Spider-Man Team-Up
Sylvia Prell is a student who is one of the Inhuman descendants. She is exposed to the Terrigen Mists after it was unleashed upon Earth by Black Bolt. The manifestation of her electrical powers caught the attention of the Superior Spider-Man. Upon mastering her powers and becoming Fulmina, she helps the Superior Spider-Man defeat an alien army that works for Thanos.

Thunderbolts
Gordon "Gordo" Nobili is the patriarch of a Maggia family known as the Nobili Crime Family and is the father of Carmen Nobili and Joseph Nobili. The Nobilis have been fighting with various rival families including the Paguro family. When he underwent Terrigenesis while evading the Thunderbolts, he finds himself with purple skin, several massive spikes growing from his head, super-strength, and the ability to communicate with his deceased ancestors. Soon after hatching, Gordon, Carmen (who inherited superhuman strength), and Joseph Nobili (who gained elasticity and tendril-like fingers) go to fight the Paguro Family. During the fight with the Paguro family, the Thunderbolts interfered where Gordon loses Carmen and Joseph (one to crossfire in a huge firefight, one committing suicide after seeing what he had become) and vows vengeance on the person he thinks is responsible for everything....Punisher.

Titles involved
Note: Some of these are involved with Infinity and not necessarily part of it.

Collected editions

Other versions

What If?
Five different issues of What If detail about alternate outcomes for the Infinity storyline:
 "What If? Infinity - Inhumans" details what would happen if Black Bolt betrayed Earth.
 "What If? Infinity - Thanos" details what would happen if Thanos joined the Avengers.
 "What If? Infinity - X-Men" details what would happen if the X-Men were the sole survivors of Infinity.
 "What If? Infinity - Dark Reign" details what would happen if Norman Osborn managed to get his hands on the Infinity Gauntlet.
 "What If? Infinity - Guardians of the Galaxy" details what would happen if the Guardians of the Galaxy found out the Illuminati were hiding Thanos.

ReceptionInfinity received largely positive reviews. Comic Book Round Up gave the Infinity series an average score of 8.0. (Note: The Average Score ComicBook Round Up gave the Infinity Event on their website consists of multiple comics that link to Infinity instead of being part of it, like the issues previously listed are.) ComicBook Round Up gave Infinity: Omnibus, which collects Infinity #1-6, Avengers #14-23, The New Avengers #7-12, and Infinity: Against the Tide Infinite Comic #1-2, an average "positive" score of 7.8.

IGN gave Infinity #1 an 8.4 "Great" Rating, Infinity #2 an 8.3 "Great" Rating, Infinity #3 an 8.3 "Great" Rating, Infinity #4 an 8.4 "Great" Rating, Infinity #5 an 8.5 "Great" Rating and Infinity #6 an 8.4 "Great" Rating. In their review for #1, IGN state "Infinity [#1] isn't your typical Marvel event comic, and that's definitely a good thing" and, throughout their reviews of each issue, praise the use of the wider Marvel Universe, the pacing, and how it "reads like a natural extension of Hickman's Avengers work", the depiction of Inhumans, the strong sense of scope and drama and the cohesive art, though criticising how it doesn't function well as an isolated story and "reads better with tie-ins".

Comic Book Resources stated that Infinity is "one of Marvel's strongest event series in years", and gave Infinity #1 a rating of 9.0 calling "a summer comic in all its glory. The cast is immense, the action is intense. The scene between Outrider and Black Bolt elevates the Inhuman king, who becomes one of the most interesting and mysterious characters in the Marvel Universe just by virtue of his "Infinity" appearance.". CBR called Infinity #2 "a must-read.", giving it 9.0, and in their review of Infinity #3, gave it 9.0 and called it "rife with intrigue, twists and poignant moments" and that "Hickman creates a dark, foreboding atmosphere appropriate to a war that seems impossible to win in his narration and dialogue". CBR called Infinity #4 (along with Infinity itself) "testament to Hickman's superb writing that readers should expect something really special yet to come" and called the visuals "simply brilliant", giving it 9.0. CBR also called Infinity #5 a "great comic for those looking for pure, unfiltered, cosmic space adventure, and nothing but. Such an adventure, though, without sufficient characterization to support it and provide a human connection is like a one-note guitar solo, or a one-ingredient recipe", giving it 5.0, and in their review for Infinity #6, gave it 9.0 and stated that it finished Infinity "in a most satisfying manner, presenting a solid template for future events." calling it "easily one of the most visually brilliant comic event conclusions produced in the past few years".

Newsarama gave Infinity #1 a score of 8 out of 10, Infinity #2 a score of 6 out of 10, Infinity #3 a score of 7 out of 10, Infinity #4 a score of 7 out of 10, Infinity #5 a score of 6 out of 10 and Infinity #6 a score of 8 out of 10.

SciFiNow called Infinity the "best comic event ever", calling it "about life and death", stating it "makes the Avengers truly iconic" and that it "offers closure where other events fail".

Jonathan Hickman was nominated a "Best Writer" Eisner Award for Infinity as well as East of West, The Manhattan Projects and Avengers.

In other media

Video games
 The plot of Infinity was adapted as the thirteenth Spec-Ops Mission of Marvel: Avengers Alliance, with Black Bolt as the reward hero, and Thane as the lockbox hero.

Television
 The second season finale of the animated series Avengers Assemble, "Avengers World", loosely incorporates elements from Infinity, with the Black Order freeing Thanos from imprisonment by the Nova Corps, to which he would a scheme to absorb the radiation of the core of New Korban to become titanically powerful in order to conquer the universe.

Film
 Several elements of Infinity are loosely adapted for the 2018 film Avengers: Infinity War. Most notably, Infinity War features Thanos invading Wakanda and the inclusion of the Black Order.

Literature
 Infinity'' received a prose adaptation in mid 2019, written by James A. Moore.

References

External links
 Infinity (Event) at Marvel.com

2013 comics debuts
Comics by Jonathan Hickman
Comics set in New York City
Marvel Comics storylines
Marvel Comics adapted into films